Arrone is a comune (municipality) in the Province of Terni in the Italian region Umbria, located about 70 km southeast of Perugia and about 10 km east of Terni in the Valnerina.

History
The town was founded by one nobleman from Rome, Arrone, in the 9th century, first as wooden castle, which was later rebuilt in stone. The Arroni family was ousted by the commune of Spoleto in the 13th century.

In 1799, the town was sacked and set on fire by the French troops. The church of Santa Maria Assunta has canvases by Giuseppe Bastiani, Francesco Cozza, Vincenzo Tamagni,  Giovanni di Pietro da Spoleto, and Jacopo Siculo.

See also
Nera River

References

Cities and towns in Umbria